The UEFA European Under-18 Championship 1986 Final Tournament was held in Yugoslavia. It also served as the European qualification for the 1987 FIFA World Youth Championship.

Teams

The following teams qualified for the tournament:

 
 
 
 
 
 
 
  (host, but still qualified)

Quarterfinals

Semifinals

Places 5-8

Places 1-4

Third place match

Final

Qualification to World Youth Championship
The six best performing teams qualified for the 1987 FIFA World Youth Championship.

See also
 1986 UEFA European Under-18 Championship qualifying

External links
Results by RSSSF
DDR-YUG match report
YUG-ROM match report

UEFA European Under-19 Championship
1986
Under-18
1986–87 in Yugoslav football
October 1986 sports events in Europe
1986 in Serbia
Football in Vojvodina
1986 in youth association football